Gang Starr Foundation is a collective of east coast rappers led by the hip hop group Gang Starr. It was co-founded by Boston legend Big Shug. It was established in 1993.

Group members

Current members
Big Shug  
Jeru the Damaja
Group Home (Lil' Dap, Melachi the Nutcracker)
Afu-Ra
M.O.P.
Freddie Foxxx
Ab Bueller (aka Absaloot)
Squala Orphan
True Master

Past members
Krumb Snatcha
Bahamadia

Discography
 Gangstarr Foundation Sampler (1993)
 Gangstarr Foundation & Ill Kid Records presents Krumb Snatcha Classics (2004)
 Ahead of the Game (2005)
 Big Shug / Gang Starr - The Jig Is Up / Doe In Advance
 Big Shug - The Other Side of the Game (2008)
 Big Shug (Hosted By: DJ Premier) - Never Say Die (The Pre-Album) (2005)
 Bumpy Knuckles (Hosted By: DJ Premier) - Street Triumph: The Mixxxtape Vol. 1 (2006)
 Bumpy Knuckles - Crazy Like a Foxxx (DELUXE EDITION) (2008)
 Afu-Ra - State of the Arts (2005)

References

DJ Premier
Hip hop supergroups
Hip hop collectives
American hip hop groups
Musical groups established in 1993
East Coast hip hop groups
Alternative hip hop groups
1993 establishments in Massachusetts